The 2002–03 Iowa Hawkeyes men's basketball team represented the University of Iowa as members of the Big Ten Conference during the 2002–03 NCAA Division I men's basketball season. The team was led by fourth-year head coach Steve Alford and played their home games at Carver–Hawkeye Arena. They finished the season 17–14 overall and 7–9 in Big Ten play.

Roster

Schedule/Results

|-
!colspan=8| Non-Conference Regular Season
|-

|-
!colspan=8| Big Ten Regular Season
|-

|-
!colspan=8| Big Ten tournament

|-
!colspan=8| National Invitation Tournament

Rankings

References

Iowa Hawkeyes men's basketball seasons
Iowa
Iowa
2002 in sports in Iowa
2003 in sports in Iowa